Royal Military Academy Ground is a cricket ground in Sandhurst, Berkshire near Camberley, Surrey.  The ground itself is located within the grounds of the Royal Military Academy at Sandhurst.  The first recorded match on the ground was in 1893, when Royal Military Academy Sandhurst played Dr Nicholson's XI.  In use constantly since 1893, it hosted its only first-class match in 1938, when the British Army played Oxford University.  More recently, in 2006 the ground played host to a match between Officer Cadets of the Royal Military Academy and the Afghanistan national cricket team on their first tour to England.

References

External links
Royal Military Academy Ground on CricketArchive
Royal Military Academy Ground on Cricinfo

Cricket grounds in Berkshire
Sport in the British Army
Royal Military Academy Sandhurst
Sandhurst, Berkshire
Sports venues completed in 1893